Bessie Lee Cowie ( Vickery; after first marriage, Lee; after second marriage, Lee Cowie; 10 June 1860–18 April 1950) was a New Zealand temperance campaigner, social reformer, lecturer and writer.

Biography
Bessie Vickery was born in Daylesford, Victoria, Australia on 10 June 1860.

Tbe community in which she was reared — an isolated gold-mining settlement, on the summit of the mountain range which divides the State of Victoria— offered little in the way of school advantage, and the girl was, for the most part, self-educated. She was, however, a student and developed her intellectual life rapidly, becoming known in her girlhood as a writer of stories and verses that found their way into periodicals.

At the age of 19, she married Harrison Lee, of Fitzroy, Victoria, and with him made her home in Melbourne. In 1883, Mrs. Lee became a pledged total abstainer and an enthusiastic worker in the Woman's Christian Temperance Union (W.C.T.U.). In this service, she developed a talent for lecturing, and was appointed lecturer and organizer for the Victorian Alliance. In 1890, she paid the first of several visits to England, and she was often introduced to public audiences as "Australia’s Temperance Queen".

In the agitation which accompanied the local-option polls throughout New Zealand in 1899 and 1902, Lee took a prominent part. As an advocate of woman suffrage, she also been an inspiring and successful leader, having lived to see the principle adopted in all the Australian States.

Some years after the death of Mr. Lee, she removed to New Zealand, where, in 1908, she married Andrew Cowie, a native of Scotland residing at Winton, and thereafter, she came to be known as Mrs. Lee Cowie.

Making her residence at Dunedin, she was appointed World Missionary of the W.C.T.U. at the session held in Geneva, Switzerland, in 1900. Her lecture-tours covered Palestine, Egypt, and Ceylon, besides parts of other countries and the whole of Australia and New Zealand. Lee Cowie attended the World's W.C.T.U. convention held in London in 1920. In 1924, she visited the U.S., on her seventh trip around the world.

She was a voluminous author of works of fiction, besides articles and songs.

References

External links
 
 Betsy (Bessie) Lee, Australian Dictionary of Biography

1860 births
1950 deaths
New Zealand educators
New Zealand activists
New Zealand women activists
New Zealand academics
New Zealand temperance activists
Australian emigrants to New Zealand
New Zealand writers
People from Daylesford, Victoria